Kastro-Kyllini is a former municipality in Elis, West Greece, Greece. Since the 2011 local government reform it is part of the municipality Andravida-Kyllini, of which it is a municipal unit. The municipal unit has an area of 49.322 km2. The population was 3,622 in 2011. The municipality Kastro-Kyllini was created in 1999 as part of the Kapodistrias reform from the formerly independent communities Kyllini, Kato Panagia, Kastro and Neochori, that became municipal districts. After the 2011 Kallikratis reform, these municipal districts became (dependent) communities. Its seat of administration was the small port town of Kyllini.

Geography

It covers the northern part of the Kyllini peninsula, which juts into the Ionian Sea. The peninsula is covered with hills, but the area to the east of the peninsula is very flat. Between the northernmost point, Cape Kyllini, and the town Kyllini the ruins of the medieval town of Glarentza have been excavated. There are forests and olive groves in the hills. Agriculture is the dominant land use in the plains.

There are several popular beaches on the coast. The thermal springs of Kyllini (Loutra Kyllinis) are the largest beach facility in the western Peloponnese. There is a monastery, the Monastery of Blachernae, southeast of Kato Panagia. The small island Kafkalida, near Cape Kyllini, is uninhabited. It carries a lighthouse.

Transportation 
There were two railway lines in Kastro-Kyllini. The Kavasila – Vartholomio – Kyllini railway branched off the Patras – Pyrgos railway at Kavasila, and ran to Kyllini via Vartholomio. A branch line ran from Vartholomio to Loutra Kyllinis. Both lines have been abandoned. Several secondary roads connect the villages.

Subdivisions
The municipal unit Kastro-Kyllini is subdivided into the following communities (constituent villages in brackets):

Kyllini

Kato Panagia
The community of Kato Panagia consists of the villages Kato Panagia, Ikaros and Moni Vlachernon. The village Kato Panagia is directly adjacent to Kyllini, on the road to Lechaina. The village Ikaros is  further east, also on the coast. Refugees from Asia Minor settled in Kato Panagia as a result of the Greco-Turkish War (1919–1922).

Kastro

The community of Kastro consists of the town Kastro and the small villages Analipsi, Kalamia, Karavaki, Loutra Kyllinis and Psili Rachi. It is situated in the hills, and is dominated by the Chlemoutsi fortress. The name Kastro means "castle", and refers to Chlemoutsi. The fortress was built by prince Geoffrey I Villehardouin of the Principality of Achaea in 1220-1223, who called it Clairmont (from which Chlemoutsi is a derivation ). After the decline of the Principality the castle gradually lost its importance. Today it is as a monument and is sometimes used for concerts.

It is a beach resort, surrounded by forests. The most famous baths also offers inhalation therapy, said to assist in asthma and skin problems. It is situated next to Roman ruins.

Neochori
The community of Neochori consists of the villages Neochori and Vytinaiika. Neochori is in a flat, rural area.

External links

Kastro official website

References

 
Populated places in Elis
Mediterranean port cities and towns in Greece
Spa towns in Greece

ro:Kato Panagia